Wołoszyn is a mountain massif in the Tatra Mountains in Poland It reaches 2,155 meters at its highest peak.

Wołoszyn is part of the Polish Tatra National Park.

References 
 SummitPost Woloszyn
 Mountain Forecast Woloszyn

Two-thousanders of Poland